William Leslie "Buddy" Aydelette (born August 19, 1956) is a former American football guard.  He began his career with the Green Bay Packers of the National Football League (NFL). He was drafted by the Packers in the 7th round (169th overall) of the 1980 NFL Draft.  He would go on to become noteworthy for being the most decorated guard in the history of the rival USFL. Over the 3 seasons, Aydelette started for the Birmingham Stallions, he would make every USFL All-League team and every TSN USFL All-Star Team.

In 1983, the Stallions offense led the league in rushing. In 1984, the Stallions would again lead the league in rushing averaging 184 yards rushing per game and  QB Cliff Stoudt would finish with a 101.6 QB rating, good for 3rd in the league. They would end the season as the league's #2 offense, behind the run and shoot offense of Jim Kelly's Houston Gamblers. The 1985 team would finish 3rd in the league in offense behind the Gamblers and Bobby Hebert's Oakland Invaders team.

After the USFL folded, Aydelette finished his football career with one final season in the NFL with the Pittsburgh Steelers

External links
NFL.com bio

References

Sportspeople from Mobile, Alabama
Players of American football from Alabama
American football offensive guards
Alabama Crimson Tide football players
Green Bay Packers players
Birmingham Stallions players
Pittsburgh Steelers players
1956 births
Living people